The Donner family is one of the renowned and wealthy Finland-Swedish families that grew in importance during the times of the Grand Duchy of Finland. Family members have been influential in Finnish politics and culture.

 Jürgen Donner (died c. 1681)
 Jochim Donner (1669–1748)
 Alexander Donner (1708–1772)
 Joachim Donner (1763–1822)
 Anders Donner Sr. (1796–1857)
Anders Donner Jr. (1827–1858)
 Anders Severin Donner (1854–1938), astronomer.
 Sven Donner (1890–1970)
 Märta Donner (1922–2013)
 Alexander Donner (1827–1892)
 Joakim Otto Evert Donner (1864–1942)
 Gustav Donner (1902–1940)
 Heinrich Wolfgang Donner (1904–1980)
 Otto Donner (1835–1909), linguist, publisher and politician
Ossian Donner (1866–1957), industrialist and diplomat.
Sir Patrick Donner (1904–1988), British Member of Parliament, son of Ossian.
 Otto Donner Jr. (1871–1932)
Hans Otto Donner  (1903–1982)
Henrik Otto Donner (1939–2013), musician, co-founder of Love Records
Philip Donner (1945–)
Uno Donner (1872–1958), married Olly Donner (1881–1956)
 Karl Reinhold "Kai" Donner (1888–1935), linguist and politician.
Kai Otto Donner (1922–1995) professor of zoology
 Kristian Donner (1952–)
 Ulla Donner (1988–)
 Joakim Donner (1926–), professor of geology and paleontology. Son of Kai Donner (1888-1935).
Gabriel Donner (1957-), lawyer
Julia Lindqvist nee Donner (1960-) 
Sara Langstone nee Donner (1966-)
 Jörn Donner (1933–2020), writer, film director, actor, producer and politician. Brother of Joakim Donner.
Johan Donner (1955–)
Jakob Donner-Amnell (1959–)
Rafael Donner (1990–)
 Harry Donner (1889–1954)
 Eva Louise Tigerstedt, originally Donner (1890–1967)

See also
 Swedish-speaking population of Finland

References